Dumville is a surname. Notable people with the surname include:

Bush Dumville (born 1945), Canadian politician
David Dumville (born 1949), British medievalist and Celtic scholar 
Hephzibah Dumville (1833–1869), writer about life for common women in the antebellum Midwest